Oleksandr Serhiyovych Prodan (born 27 March 1998) is a Ukrainian equestrian. He competed in the individual jumping event at the 2020 Summer Olympics.

References

External links
 

1998 births
Living people
Ukrainian male equestrians
Olympic equestrians of Ukraine
Equestrians at the 2020 Summer Olympics
Show jumping riders
Sportspeople from Dnipro